Initiative for Open Authentication (OATH) is an industry-wide collaboration to develop an open reference architecture using open standards to promote the adoption of strong authentication. It has close to thirty coordinating and contributing members and is proposing standards for a variety of authentication technologies, with the aim of lowering costs and simplifying their functions.

Terminology 
The name OATH is an acronym from the phrase "open authentication", and is pronounced as the English word "oath".

OATH is not related to OAuth, an open standard for authorization.

See also 
HOTP: An HMAC-Based One-Time Password Algorithm (RFC 4226)
TOTP: Time-Based One-Time Password Algorithm (RFC 6238)
OCRA: OATH Challenge-Response Algorithm (RFC 6287)
Portable Symmetric Key Container (PSKC) (RFC 6030)
Dynamic Symmetric Key Provisioning Protocol (DSKPP) (RFC 6063)
FIDO Alliance

References

External links 

List of OATH members
OATH Specifications

Computer security organizations
Computer access control